Eastman is a municipality of about 2,300 people, part of the Memphrémagog Regional County Municipality in the Eastern Townships region of Quebec, Canada.

Demographics

Population
Population trend:

(+) Amalgamation of the Municipality of Stukely and the Village of Eastman on May 30, 2001.

Language
Mother tongue (2021)

See also 
 List of municipalities in Quebec

References

External links

Designated places in Quebec
Municipalities in Quebec
Incorporated places in Estrie